Fabio Gall is a footballer from the Cayman Islands who plays for Academy SC. He also periodically plays flag football.

Flag Football

Gall plays flag football in the off-season to keep fit in preparation for the Cayman Islands Premier League season. He was the men's Cayman Islands Flag Football League Player of the Week in 2014.

Personal life

Gall's sister, Shenel, is 'the first professional female footballer from the Cayman Islands' and plays rugby too. When they were children, they used to practice together behind their house everyday and had reoccurring disputes about who was a better athlete.

He idolizes Thierry Henry, who stimulated his interest in soccer.

References

External links
 

Cayman Islands international footballers
Living people
Caymanian footballers
Association football defenders
Association football wingers
American football quarterbacks
Year of birth missing (living people)